Ahmadabad-e Banakdar (also Romanized as Aḩmadābād-e Banaḵdār; also known as Aḩmadābād) is a village in Gol Banu Rural District, Pain Jam District, Torbat-e Jam County, Razavi Khorasan Province, Iran. At the 2006 census, its population was 11, in 4 families.

See also 

 List of cities, towns and villages in Razavi Khorasan Province

References 

Populated places in Torbat-e Jam County